Georgios Gougoulias (Greek: Γιώργος Γκουγκουλιάς) is a football striker playing for Panserraikos. Of Greek descent, he was born and spent his childhood in Schweinfurt, Germany where he started playing football at its academy. His senior football, started at Reutlingen and Grossbardorf, before eventually moving to Greece in 2004 signing with Pavlos Melas FC.

Football characteristics

He is more less a tall footballer, and jumping/heading is the strongest part of his football game. Also noted for his smart and aware movements in the opposition box which in a lot of occasions helped him find a good position and score goals. Also, he is not that slow for his height and body constitution. At younger age, used to play some more demoted attacking positions (as a forward behind a main striker or left forward, even rarely an AM) but wasn't exactly tested much on those positions in Greece and its teams. Nowadays, he is a striker who lives from a good supply.

Aris
The following year he joined Aris FC, at the beginning of Aris' second division adventure 2005/06 and immediately established himself as a starting line-up player, scoring several goals, especially in the first part of the season when Aris rather had an unexpectedly average start. At the time, attacking with him played Ioakim Beniskos with all rounder Fernando Sanjurjo behind, and Caceres striking more from left. At the half-season Christmas break, Aris did not look particularly good (yet not that far from the top of the division either) and they needed some strengthening transfers in order to immediately bounce back and return to the A category. They bought Ethymis Kouloucheris (defender) and even more importantly Paulo Costa and Nikos Skarmoutsos to empower their attack. The buys seemed exactly spot on, all immediately establishing themselves in the line up, helping Aris a lot in the attacking sector, which further meant that Gougoulias' starting spot had been in doubt, eventually losing it, with only being an occasional starter, consequently dropping his great scoring ratio.

Aris came back to the first division, and in the season 2006/07, after huge roster sweeping where Aris totally lived a rebirth and squad upgrades with superior quality players, compared to the previous seasons, with the likes of Koke, Javito, Weisheimer etc., Gougoulias lost completely his spot and never was trusted by coaches Hoyos and Quique Hernandez at the time.

In the season 2007/08 Bajević firstly decided to count on him, keeping him in roster, but soon afterwards he suffered one serious injury that parted him from pitch for almost half of the year. After that, never regained the needed form, but again Bajević did not want to completely write him off. He gave him a chance in the second half against AEK at Kleanthis Vikelidis (0:1 loss), mainly due to eventual lack of attacking options at the time, where he played very disappointingly and after the match, he was never recounted by Aris any more.

Post-Aris days

First part of the season 2008/09 he spent at PAS Giannina in the second division scoring a couple of goals, but PAS did not get what expected from him after the brighter start and first couple of goals.

At the winter transfer period of 2008-09 he signed for Panserraikos, but making no serious impact generally coming on from bench.

External links
 Greeksoccer.com forums, Gougoulias topic

References

1983 births
Living people
Greek footballers
German footballers
German people of Greek descent
SSV Reutlingen 05 players
1. FC Schweinfurt 05 players
Aris Thessaloniki F.C. players
Panserraikos F.C. players
PAS Giannina F.C. players
Pierikos F.C. players
Association football forwards
People from Schweinfurt
Sportspeople from Lower Franconia
Footballers from Bavaria